Jean-Paul Delevoye (born 22 January 1947) is a French politician.

Political career
After having worked in the food industry, he began his political career as a village councilman in 1974. Since 1982, he is the mayor of Bapaume, a small town in northern France (except between 2002 and 2004).

Between 1992 and 2002, he was president of the French mayors association and a Senator of the Pas-de-Calais département, before being promoted to Minister of the Civil Service. After two years in the French government, he is appointed as the Mediator of the French Republic (Médiateur de la République), his term of office ending in 2010.

From 2010 to 2015, Delevoye is the head of the French Economic, Social and Environmental Council.

Since 14 September 2017, he was High commissioner in charge of the French pension system reform,.

On 3 September 2019, he became delegate minister in charge of the pension reform, under supervision of Agnès Buzyn, minister for Solidarity and Health in the Philippe government.

It was revealed by the Le Parisien in December 2019, then by Le Monde and Capital, that he forgot to indicate to the HATVP several functions he had in various organisms, some of them paid and illegal under the French constitution, and including some which could be in Conflict of interest with his role in the government.

On 19 December 2019, the HATVP informed the Tribunal de grande instance de Paris which began a formal investigation.

Under pressure, he resigned from his government position on 16 December 2019.

References

External links
  Brief presentation of Jean-Paul Delevoye on the French Senate website
 The French mayors association official website
 The Mediator of the French Republic official website

1947 births
Living people
French Ministers of Civil Service
Ombudsmen in France
People from Pas-de-Calais
Union for a Popular Movement politicians
La République En Marche! politicians
Senators of Pas-de-Calais
Politicians from Hauts-de-France